This is a list of minor planets which have been officially named by the Working Group Small Body Nomenclature (WGSBN) of the International Astronomical Union (IAU). The list consists of partial pages, each covering a number range of 1,000 bodies citing the source after each minor planet was named for. An overview of all existing partial pages is given in section .

Among the hundreds of thousands of numbered minor planets only a small fraction have received a name so far. , there are 23,542 named minor planets out of a total of more than 600,000 numbered ones . Most of these bodies are named for people, in particular astronomers, as well as figures from mythology and fiction. Many minor planets are also named after places such cities, towns, and villages, mountains and volcanoes; after rivers, observatories, as well as organizations, clubs and astronomical societies. Some are named after animals and plants. A few minor planets are named after exotic entities such as supercomputers or have an unknown origin.

The first few thousand minor planets have all been named, with the near-Earth asteroid (4596) 1981 QB currently being the lowest-numbered unnamed minor planet. The first 3 pages in the below table contain 1,000 named entries each. The first 13 and 33 pages contain at least 500 and 100 named entries each, respectively. The first range to contain no entries is 258001–259000. There are also several name conflicts with other astronomical objects, mostly with planetary satellites and among themselves. 

Following a proposal of the discovering astronomer, new minor planet names are approved and published by IAU's WGSBN several times a year. The WGSBN applies a set of rules for naming minor planets. These range from syntax restrictions to non-offensive meanings. Over the years the rules have changed several times. In the beginning, for example, most minor planets were named after female characters from Greek and Roman mythology.

Index 

This is an overview of all existing partial lists on the meanings of minor planets (MoMP). Each table covers 100,000 minor planets, with each cell representing a specific partial list of 1,000 sequentially numbered bodies. Grayed out cells do not yet contain any citations for the corresponding number range. For an introduction, see .

Meanings from 1 to 100,000

Meanings from 100,001 to 200,000

Meanings from 200,001 to 300,000

Meanings from 300,001 to 400,000

Meanings from 400,001 to 500,000

Meanings from 500,001 to 600,000

Meanings from 600,001 to 700,000

See also 
 List of minor planets
 List of named minor planets (alphabetical)

References

External links 
 Asteroids discovered at the observatory of San Marcello Pistoiese in Italy
 Asteroids discovered by Uppsala astronomers
 Asteroids honoring people associated with Cornell Department of astronomy
 Asteroids named after members of staff and graduates of the Department of Astronomy, University of Maryland
 Asteroids with Canadian Connections
 Asteroids with a Hamburg connection
 Hungarian asteroids
 In Our Skies journalistic article on asteroid nomenclature
 Institute of Applied Astronomy's list of (accented) names
 Kleť Numbered Minor Planets
 List of "Dutch" asteroids (in Dutch)
 Planetary Society asteroids
 The Ceres Connection (asteroids named after students)

Some systematic sources of citations are:
 The database of the Minor Planet Center can be searched: http://www.minorplanetcenter.net/db_search/
 The JPL Small-Body Database Browser: http://ssd.jpl.nasa.gov/sbdb.cgi
 The Minor Planet Center has lists of discovery circumstances for numbered minor planets which link to a script at the Harvard University Center for Astronomy MPES (Minor Planet Ephemeris Service) that displays citations.
 The Minor Planet Center also provides a search engine allowing a search of its database from your browser.
In the first two cases you need only modify the last argument of the address to the name or number of the minor planet. The lists of discovery circumstances are split into groups of 5000 minor planets, each containing links for individual named minor planets that access the script displaying citations.

 *
meanings